Karl Willimann George (November 14, 1894 – December 28, 1979) was a guard in the National Football League. He played for the Racine Legion during the 1922 NFL season.

References

People from Gallipolis, Ohio
Racine Legion players
American football offensive guards
Carroll Pioneers football players
Loras Duhawks football players
1894 births
1979 deaths